Disney on Parade, was a series of touring arena stage shows produced by a joint venture between NBC and Walt Disney Productions, through their subsidiary Nawal Productions. Aimed primarily at children and families, the shows featured live performers portraying the roles of Disney characters in performances derived from various Disney films.

History
The initial concept for the production was conceived by Thomas Sarnoff and presented to his father, Robert Sarnoff. The elder Sarnoff had served as the President of National Broadcasting Company (NBC) and CEO of Radio Corporation of America (RCA). NBC at the time aired The Wonderful World of Disney weekly anthology television series. To produce the show, Walt Disney Productions teamed with the network to create Nawal Productions, with NBC being the general partner and Disney the limited partner.

Following a trial run in Long Beach, California, the first edition of Disney on Parade launched in Chicago, Illinois on December 25, 1969, and was an instant success. However, the show suffered from an overabundance of props, inexperienced performers, high costs and a run time of nearly three hours, so NBC replaced producer Bob Jani with Michel M. Grilikhes, who made effective changes, including rearranging or removing acts, to reduce costs and time without affecting the show's quality. Grilikhes, affectionately known to the cast and crew as "Mr. G", would executive-produce and direct further editions of Disney on Parade.

Four editions of Disney on Parade, each with a different set of acts, would tour across the United States and around the world, including runs in South America, Europe, Asia and Australia; a performance in Adelaide, Australia was videotaped and broadcast as a one-hour special on NBC's The Wonderful World of Disney in December 1971. By 1976, the shows ceased performing internationally.

Format
Each edition of Disney on Parade typically began with Mickey Mouse and a cavalcade of Disney characters dancing on the stage and personally greeting members of the audience. The show would then present lavish musical segments, depicting characters and scenes from Disney films, alongside smaller comedy routines with characters like Donald Duck, Goofy and Herbie the Love Bug. Finally, the characters appeared together for a grand finale and bid the audience farewell. Each show was divided into two acts with one 15-minute intermission.

The arena stages typically sported a giant curtain, from which characters and sets would emerge, and a circular motion picture screen that would present clips from Disney features and shorts at the beginning of major acts.

Reception
Disney on Parade was well received by audiences and critics. The first edition's run at Madison Square Garden made a record $400,000 in advanced ticket sales, and a run in Salt Lake City, Utah booked 77,255 people in nine days, some 38% of the population. It later toured Europe, Australia, Asia and Latin America, making $64 million worldwide.

References

1969 establishments in Illinois
1969 in theatre
1976 disestablishments
Joint ventures
Mass media franchises introduced in 1969
National Broadcasting Company
Plays based on films
The Walt Disney Company
Stage play franchises